Music of Remembrance is a non-profit classical chamber music organization based in Seattle whose purpose is to find and perform music composed by victims of the Holocaust, irrespective of their background, as well as to perform related newly commissioned works.

History 
Music of Remembrance was founded 1998 in Seattle by Mina Miller, who is also president and artistic director, to find and perform music composed by victims of the Holocaust, irrespective of their background, as well as to perform related newly commissioned works.

They also give a free Sparks of Glory series of concerts with associated commentary at venues including the Seattle Art Museum and run an educational outreach program throughout Washington State. In 2005, they established the David Tonkonogui Memorial Award for young musicians. Since 2015, Music of Remembrance present a free community-wide concert at Benaroya Hall every January to mark International Holocaust Remembrance Day and the anniversary of the liberation of Auschwitz-Birkenau. Also since 2015, they have brought their programs to the Bay Area with an annual major concert in San Francisco.

The 2020–2021 season was disrupted by the COVID-19 pandemic, and replaced by a series of four online concerts.

Most of the performing instrumental artists are drawn from the Seattle Symphony. Seattle Symphony violinist Mikhail Shmidt, violist Susan Gulkis Assadi, and clarinetist Laura DeLuca have performed with Music of Remembrance since its founding. Flutist Zart Dambourian-Eby, violinist Natasha Bazhanov, cellist Walter Gray, pianist Jessica Choe, and double bassist Jonathan Green have made frequent appearances.

Repertoire
Music of Remembrance's repertoire is made up of historic pieces by composers who perished in or survived the Holocaust and contemporary commissions that share lessons of the Holocaust.

The company's first recording, Art from Ashes – volume 1 (2002), included: Serenata, written in Terezín concentration camp in 1942, the only surviving piece by Robert Dauber who died in Dachau in 1945; Five Pieces for String Quartet (1924) by Erwin Schulhoff, who died in Wülzburg in 1942, and Herman Berlinski's Flute Sonata, lost when he left Paris and reconstructed in the USA in 1942.

Music specially commissioned by the company includes Camp Songs (2002) by Paul Schoenfield, five songs set to poems by Aleksander Kulisiewicz who was interned in Sachsenhausen concentration camp. This piece was one of three finalists for the Pulitzer Prize for Music in 2003 and was also on their first recording.

Music of Remembrance also commissioned three pieces by Jake Heggie: For a Look or A Touch (2007, for baritone and actor), about the persecution of gay men during the Holocaust; Another Sunrise (2012, soprano), based on the life and work of Polish resistance member and Auschwitz survivor  and Farewell, Auschwitz (2013, soprano, mezzo-soprano, baritone), based on lyrics by Żywulska translated by Gene Scheer. Heggie incorporated these pieces into an opera in three parts, Out of Darkness (2013) with libretto by Scheer, of which Music of Remembrance presented the world première May 2016 in Seattle, with further performances planned for San Francisco.

The company's presentations also include more established music, such as Different Trains (1988) by Steve Reich, which compares his experiences of travelling by train in America with the very different experiences of being transported to a concentration camp in Nazi-occupied Europe, and Verklärte Nacht (1899) by Arnold Schönberg, who recognised the Nazi danger early and emigrated to America in 1934. This was the music for the world première of Donald Byrd's dances Transfigured Night performed by Spectrum Dance Theatre.

Discography
Music of Remembrance's first CD was on the Innova label. Since then, they have recorded several CDs for Naxos.

Commissions
Music of Remembrance commissions Holocaust-inspired works by living composers to build a bridge between Holocaust musicians and a new generation of artists and audiences. These new works are intended to embrace the Holocaust’s legacy of spiritual resistance through music, and of communicating this legacy to audiences in today’s world.

Young Artist Award
In 2005, Music of Remembrance established the David Tonkonogui Memorial Award in memory of cellist David Tonkonogui (1958–2003). This is open to young musicians from the Seattle area who wish to perform music with a connection to the Holocaust. As well as a monetary award for continuing musical study, recipients are invited to perform at a Music of Remembrance concert.

References

Citations:

External links
 

1998 establishments in Washington (state)
Performing groups established in 1998
Holocaust commemoration
American orchestras
Musical groups established in 1998
Musical groups from Seattle